In the scientific discipline of economics,  the Econometric Society is a learned society devoted to the advancement of economics by using mathematical and statistical methods. This article is a list of its (current and in memory) fellows.

Fellows

1933

 Luigi Amoroso
 Oskar N. Anderson
 Albert Aupetit
 
 A. L. Bowley
 Clément Colson
 Gustavo Del Vecchio
 François Divisia
 Griffith C. Evans
 Irving Fisher
 Ragnar Frisch
 Corrado Gini
 Gottfried Haberler
 Harold Hotelling
 John M. Keynes
 N. D. Kondratiev
 Wesley C. Mitchell
 H. L. Moore
 Umberto Ricci
 Charles F. Roos
 M. Jacques Rueff
 
 Henry Schultz
 Joseph A. Schumpeter
 J. Tinbergen
 Felice Vinci
 Edwin B. Wilson
 
 F. Zeuthen

1935

 R. G. D. Allen
 Costantino Bresciani Turroni
 Mordecai Ezekiel
 J. Marschak

1937

 Alfred Cowles 3rd
 J. R. Hicks
 Giorgio Mortara
 René Roy
 Hans Staehle

1939

 Oskar Lange
 Wassily Leontief
 Josiah Charles Stamp
 Theodore Otte Yntema

1940

 William Leonard Crum
 Harold Thayer Davis
 T. Koopmans
 Simon S. Kuznets
 Frederick Cecil Mills
 Gunnar Myrdal
 Gerhard Tintner
 Abraham Wald

1944

 Colin Clark
 Paul H. Douglas
 Trygve Haavelmo
 M. Kalecki
 Paul A. Samuelson

1945

 Nicholas Kaldor
 Jacob L. Mosak
 Bertil Ohlin
 Richard Stone
 Elmer J. Working

1946

 Herman, O. A. Wold

1947

 J.M Clark
 Friedrich A. Hayek
 Leonid Hurwicz
 Erik Lindahl
 Arthur Smithies
 John von Neumann
 Frederick V. Waugh
 Samuel S. Wilks
 Holbrook Working

1948

 Arthur F. Burns
 J. B. D. Derksen
 Luigi Einaudi
 
 Lawrence R. Klein
 Abba P. Lerner
 Lloyd A. Metzler
 Egon S. Pearson
 Walter A. Shewhart

1949

 Maurice Allais
 Abram Bergson
 Bernard Chait
 Milton Friedman
 M. G. Kendall
 P.C. Mahalanobis
 Franco Modigliani

1950

 Johan Åkerman
 T. W. Anderson
 Dorothy S. Brady
 R. Maurice Fréchet
 Nicholas Georgescu-Roegen
 Alvin H. Hansen
 Oskar Morgenstern
 Jerzy Neyman

1951

 Kenneth J. Arrow
 Robert Charles Geary
 Richard M. Goodwin
 
 R. F. Harrod
 Leo Törnqvist

1952

 Tibor Barna
 Georges Darmois
 Hendrik S. Houthakker
 Jacques J. Polak
 Olav Reiersøl
 James Tobin

1953

 William J. Baumol
 Marcel Boiteux
 George B. Dantzig
 Clifford Hildreth
 Don Patinkin
 P. J. Verdoorn

1954

 Gérard Debreu
 Pierre Benjamin Daniel Massé
 
 Herbert A. Simon

1955

 Robert Dorfman
 Edmond Malinvaud
 Sten Malmquist
 
 Richard Ruggles
 Henri Theil

1956

 John S. Chipman
 
 Eraldo Fossati
 Guy Henderson Orcutt
 Hans Peter

1957

 William W. Cooper
 Robert M. Solow
 Michel Verhulst
 Jacob Wolfowitz

1958

 Martin J. Beckmann
 Hollis B. Chenery
 
 Lionel W. McKenzie
 Michio Morishima
 Thomson M. Whitin

1959

 Abraham Charnes
 Karl A. Fox
 Harry M. Markowitz
 G. L. S. Shackle
 Robert H. Strotz

1960

 Alan S. Manne
 Marc Nerlove
 Hirofumi Uzawa

1961

 Bruno de Finetti
 W. M. Gorman
 Frank H. Hahn
 Harold W. Kuhn
 Roy Radner

1962

 Robert Eisner
 M. J. Farrell
 
 Hukukane Nikaidô
 Herbert E. Scarf

1963

 Karl H. Borch
 Franklin M. Fisher
 William Jaffé
 J. Johnston
 Wilhelm E. Krelle
 John D. Sargan

1964

 Arthur S. Goldberger
 Zvi Griliches
 Earl O. Heady
 Dale W. Jorgenson
 André Nataf
 A. W. Phillips

1965

 Robert J. Aumann
 Jacques Drèze
 David Gale
 Edwin Kuh
 Ta-Chung Liu
 Jan Sandee
 Arnold Zellner

1966

 Albert Ando
 R. L. Basmann
 James S. Duesenberry
 Edward J. Hannan
 Leif Johansen
 Nissan Liviatan
 John R. Meyer
 Takashi Negishi
 George J. Stigler
 Daniel B. Suits

1967

 Gary Becker
 Michael Bruno
 Gregory C. Chow
 Carl F. Christ
 James Durbin
 Walter D. Fisher
 Arnold Harberger
 Jacques Lesourne
 Edmund S. Phelps
 Lloyd S. Shapley
 William S. Vickrey

1968

 Irma Adelman
 Anton P. Barten
 Peter A. Diamond
 Evsey D. Domar
 
 John C. Harsanyi
 Charles J. Hitch
 Ken-Ichi Inada
 János Kornai
 Benoit Mandelbrot
 John F. Muth
 Richard E. Quandt
 Amartya Sen
 Lester Telser
 Carl von Weizsäcker

1970

 
 Sukhamoy Chakraborty
 Phoebus J. Dhrymes
 Otto Eckstein
 Martin Feldstein
 Edwin Mansfield
 Daniel McFadden
 James Mirrlees
 Yair Mundlak
 A. L. Nagar
 Stanley Reiter
 
 T. N. Srinivasan
 
 Menahem Yaari

1971

 Pietro Balestra
 Rex Bergstrom
 
 Nikolay P. Fedorenko
 William Fellner
 Robert W. Fogel
 Werner Hildenbrand
 Charles C. Holt
 Ronald W. Jones
 Murray C. Kemp
 Mordecai Kurz
 David Levhari
 John Lintner
 Arthur Okun
 Ronald W. Shephard
 Eytan Sheshinski
 Martin Shubik
 Jean Waelbroeck
 Alan A. Walter

1972

 David Cass
 J. S. Cramer
 R. E. Gomory
 C. W. J. Granger
 Harry G. Johnson
 Leonid V. Kantorovich
 Kevin J. Lancaster
 Richard G. Lipsey
 Jacob Mincer
 C. R. Rao
 Karl Shell
 Hugo Sonnenschein

1973

 R. J. Ball
 Jagdish Bhagwati
 Anne Carter
 Eugene F. Fama
 Stephen M. Goldfeld
 Robert E. Hall
 Serge-Christophe Kolm
 Assar Lindbeck
 Bagicha Singh Minhas
 Jan Mossin
 
 Reinhard Selten
 Joseph E. Stiglitz

1974

 Takeshi Amemiya
 A. B. Atkinson
 W. A. Brock
 Peter C. Fishburn
 
 
 John W. Pratt
 Marcel K. Richter
 Michael Rothschild
 Christopher A. Sims

1975

 Dennis J. Aigner
 C. J. Bliss
 William C. Brainard
 Phillip Cagan
 Partha Dasgupta
 Paul A. David
 W. E. Diewert
 Jerry R. Green
 Giora Hanoch
 David Forbes Hendry
 William C. Hood
 
 Robert E. Lucas, Jr.
 G. S. Maddala
 Thomas A. Marschak
 Merton H. Miller
 Walter Y. Oi
 Ivor F. Pearce
 Howard Raiffa
 David A. Starrett
 Kenneth F. Wallis

1976

 S. N. Afriat
 G. Christopher Archibald
 Yoram Ben-Porath
 Irwin Friend
 Claude Henry
 Donald D. Hester
 Lawrence J. Lau
 Mukul Majumdar
 
 Stephen Marglin
 Sherwin Rosen
 Agnar Sandmo
 Thomas J. Sargent
 Peter Schönfeld
 Andrew Michael Spence
 Harold W. Watts
 Martin Weitzman
 Oliver E. Williamson
 Robert Wilson

1977

 Orley Ashenfelter
 Richard M. Cyert
 Avinash Dixit
 Ray C. Fair
 Stanley Fischer
 James W. Friedman
 Robert J. Gordon
 
 Peter J. Hammond
 Geoffrey Martin Heal
 Bert G. Hickman
 Edward E. Leamer
 John Ledyard
 Albert Madansky
 Andreu Mas-Colell
 Bezalel Peleg
 Robert A. Pollak
 Thomas J. Rothenberg
 Dieter Sondermann
 Paul Taubman

1978

 Abel Gesevich Aganbegyan
 Masanao Aoki
 Truman F. Bewley
 Edwin Burmeister
 Robert W. Clower
 Otto A. Davis
 Angus S. Deaton
 Rudi Dornbusch
 Koichi Hamada
 Yakar Kannai
 Teun Kloek
 Jean-Jacques Laffont
 
 Jean-Claude Milleron
 Leonard J. Mirman
 Dale T. Mortensen
 András Nagy
 Luigi L. Pasinetti
 Prasanta K. Pattanaik
 András Prékopa
 F. Graham Pyatt
 J. Trout Rader, III
 Stephen A. Ross
 
 José Alexandre Scheinkman
 Nicholas H. Stern
 
 Sidney G. Winter
 Sewall Wright
 Yves Younès

1979

 George Akerlof
 Maria Augustinovics
 Morris H. DeGroot
 Jean Jaskold Gabszewicz
 Oliver Hart
 Jerry A. Hausman
 Richard Kihlstrom
 Irving Bernard Kravis
 
 John Muellbauer
 Robert A. Mundell
 Philip S. Wolfe

1980

 Yves Balasko
 Robert J. Barro
 Jere R. Behrman
 Duncan Black
 Sanford Grossman
 Roger Guesnerie
 James J. Heckman
 James S. Jordan, Jr.
 Jan Kmenta
 Michael C. Lovell
 Harold F. Lydall
 Stephen J. Nickell
 Louis Phlips
 Edward C. Prescott
 Jean-François Richard
 David Schmeidler
 Robert J. Shiller
 Finis Welch

1981

 Masahiko Aoki
 Jean-Pascal Benassy
 Alan S. Blinder
 Donald Brown
 Gary Chamberlain
 
 Robert F. Engle
 Birgit Grodal
 Martin F. Hellwig
 David M. Kreps
 Anne O. Krueger
 Eric Maskin
 Jean-François Mertens
 Peter Charles Bonest Phillips
 Stephen J. Turnovsky
 Neil Wallace
 Robert D. Willig

1982

 Richard A. Easterlin
 Jacob A. Frenkel
 John W. Geweke
 Michael D. Intriligator
 Mervyn A. King
 Béla Martos
 D. John Roberts
 Richard L. Schmalensee
 Stephen Smale
 Charles A. Wilson

1983

 Beth E. Allen
 Bengt R. Holmström
 Robert C. Merton
 Paul Milgrom
 Hervé Moulin
 Roger B. Myerson
 Richard D. Portes
 John G. Riley
 Alvin E. Roth
 Hal R. Varian
 Halbert L. White, Jr.

1984

 Claude d'Aspremont
 Allan F. Gibbard
 Lars Peter Hansen
 Charles F. Manski
 William D. Nordhaus
 Joseph M. Ostroy
 Kevin W. S. Roberts
 Myron S. Scholes
 John B. Shoven
 John B. Taylor

1985

 Olivier Jean Blanchard
 A. Ronald Gallant
 Sergiu Hart
 Jack Hirshleifer
 Alberto Holly
 
 A. R. Pagan
 Charles R. Plott
 Andrew Postlewaite
 Ariel Rubinstein
 N. Eugene Savin
 Lawrence H. Summers
 Robert M. Townsend

1986

 Alan Auerbach
 François Bourguignon
 Egbert Dierker
 Louis Gevers
 Christian Gouriéroux
 Reuben Gronau
 Elhanan Helpman
 George G. Judge
 Heinz König
 Paul R. Krugman
 Richard Layard
 Jacques Mairesse
 
 Michael Mussa
 John E. Roemer
 Harvey Rosen
 Robert W. Rosenthal
 Jeffrey Sachs
 Mark A. Satterthwaite
 Jean Tirole
 David A. Wise

1987

 Robert M. Anderson
 Aloisio Araujo
 Kenneth George Binmore
 Drew Fudenberg
 Douglas M. Gale
 Edward J. Green
 Thomas E. MaCurdy
 J. Peter Neary
 Vernon L. Smith
 Nancy L. Stokey

1988

 
 Charles Blackorby
 Henry Farber
 Milton Harris
 Fumio Hayashi
 Paul L. Joskow
 Ehud Kalai
 Edward Lazear
 Ariél Pakes
 James Michael Poterba
 Alan A. Powell
 Peter Schmidt
 Steven Shavell
 Ken Singleton
 Alan. D. Woodland

1989

 Donald W. K. Andrews
 Costas Azariadis
 Larry G. Epstein
 John Geanakoplos
 Boyan Jovanovic
 Kenneth L. Judd
 Nicholas M. Kiefer
 David K. Levine
 Mark Machina
 Michael Maschler
 John Moore
 D. M. G. Newbery
 Whitney Newey
 Abraham Neyman
 M. Hashem Pesaran
 Victor Polterovich
 Robert H. Porter
 Jennifer F. Reinganum
 Peter M. Robinson
 Richard Roll
 Robert Summers
 Andrew Weiss
 Richard J. Zeckhauser

1990

 David P. Baron
 Timothy F. Bresnahan
 Jeremy I. Bulow
 John Y. Campbell
 JOHN C. Cox
 Vincent P. Crawford
 Douglas W. Diamond
 Pradeep Dubey
 Louis-André Gérard-Varet
 Andrew C. Harvey
 Alan P. Kirman
 Lung-Fei Lee
 James MacKinnon
 John F. Nash
 
 James L. Powell
 Paul Romer
 Julio J. Rotemberg
 Joel Sobel
 Kotaro Suzumura
 Lars E. O. Svensson
 William Thomson
 John Whalley

1991

 Andrew B. Abel
 Dilip Abreu
 Kaushik Basu
 B. Douglas Bernheim
 Richard Blundell
 Trevor S. Breusch
 David Card
 
 Gabrielle Demange
 Wilfred J. Ethier
 Claudia Goldin
 Timothy J. Kehoe
 Elon Kohlberg
 Anthony Lancaster
 David Pearce
 Herakles Polemarchakis
 Kenneth S. Rogoff
 Avner Shaked
 Joaquim Silvestre
 Thomas M. Stoker
 John Sutton
 Asher Wolinsky
 Michael Woodford

1992

 Jess Benhabib
 Andrew S. Caplin
 Jacques Crémer
 Gene M. Grossman
 Takatoshi Ito
 Laurence J. Kotlikoff
 Finn E. Kydland
 Steve Matthews
 Bennett T. McCallum
 
 James H. Stock
 
 Xavier Vives
 Mark W. Watson
 Shmuel Zamir

1993

 Philippe Aghion
 Patrick Bolton
 Christophe Chamley
 Eric van Damme
 Manfred Deistler
 Mathias Dewatripont
 Wayne A. Fuller
 Daniel Kahneman
 Lawrence Katz
 John H. Pencavel
 Robert S. Pindyck
 Debraj Ray
 John Rust
 Andrei Shleifer
 Amos Tversky
 Kenneth D. West
 Michael D. Whinston

1994

 W. Brian Arthur
 Roland Bénabou
 Ernst R. Berndt
 Stephen R. Cosslett
 Russell Davidson
 Peter Howitt
 Arie Kapteyn
 Paul Klemperer
 Glenn C. Loury
 Richard D. McKelvey
 Assaf Razin
 Michael H. Riordan
 Mark Rosenzweig
 Larry Samuelson
 Wayne J. Shafer
 George Tauchen
 Peyton Young
 William R. Zame

1995

 Abhijit V. Banerjee
 Guillermo A. Calvo
 Pierre-André Chiappori
 J. Darrell Duffie
 Jonathan Eaton
 Roger H. Gordon
 Bo Honoré
 Larry E. Jones
 George J. Mailath
 Rosa L. Matzkin
 R. Preston McAfee
 Thomas R. Palfrey
 Dale J. Poirier
 Rafael Robb
 
 Kenneth I. Wolpin

1996

 Joseph G. Altonji
 Jeffrey S. Banks
 Martin Browning
 Russell Cooper
 Eddie Dekel
 Bhaskar Dutta
 Faruk Gül
 Daniel S. Hamermesh
 James D. Hamilton
 Joel Horowitz
 Cheng Hsiao
 Morton I. Kamien
 Alan B. Krueger
 Maurice Obstfeld
 Philip Reny
 Anthony F. Shorrocks

1997

 Ben S. Bernanke
 Steven Neil Durlauf
 David Easley
 Martin S. Eichenbaum
 Françoise Forges
 Nobuhiro Kiyotaki
 John J. McCall
 John McMillan
 Tapan Mitra
 Robert A. Moffitt
 Torsten Persson
 Christopher A. Pissarides
 Quang H. Vuong
 Randall Wright

1998

 Joshua Angrist
 Lawrence E. Blume
 George J. Borjas
 Ricardo Caballero
 Varadarajan V. Chari
 Thomas F. Cooley
 Francis X. Diebold
 Jean-Marie Dufour
 Mark Gertler
 Matthew O. Jackson
 Roger Koenker
 Margaret A. Meyer
 Eric Renault
 Patrick Rey
 Dov E. Samet
 John Vickers

1999

 Steven Berry
 Tim Bollerslev
 Kenneth Burdett
 Colin F. Camerer
 Andrew Chesher
 Avner Greif
 Seppo Honkapohja
 Michihiro Kandori
 Kiminori Matsuyama
 Costas Meghir
 Motty Perry
 William P. Rogerson

2000

 Ted Bergstrom
 Timothy J. Besley
 Zvi Eckstein
 Glenn Ellison
 Itzhak Gilboa
 Bruce E. Hansen
 Hugo A. Hopenhayn
 Søren Johansen
 
 Michael Magill
 Wolfgang Pesendorfer
 Martine Quinzii
 Matthew Rabin
 Sylvain Sorin

2001

 Orazio Attanasio
 Lawrence Christiano
 John Cochrane
 Guido Imbens
 Edi Karni
 Ehud Lehrer
 Bernard Salanié
 
 Guido Tabellini
 Myrna Wooders

2002

 Yacine Aït-Sahalia
 Alberto F. Alesina
 Manuel Arellano
 Michele Boldrin
 In-Koo Cho
 John Conlisk
 Raymond Deneckere
 Joseph Farrell
 Robert Gibbons
 Vijay Krishna
 Albert S. (Pete) Kyle
 Andrew W. Lo
 Stephen Morris
 Joon Y. Park
 
 Chris Shannon
 Jeffrey M. Wooldridge

2003

 Kalyan Chatterjee
 Dennis Epple
 Roger E. A. Farmer
 Jordi Galí
 Jinyong Hahn
 V. Joseph Hotz
 
 Arthur Lewbel
 
 Charles R. Nelson
 Martin J. Osborne
 Geert Ridder
 Paul A. Ruud
 Ilya Segal
 Arunava Sen
 Tayfun Sönmez
 Marilda Antonia de Oliveira Sotomayor
 Harald Uhlig
 Anthony J. Venables
 Peter Wakker

2004

 Anat Admati
 Susan Athey
 John Bound
 Adam Brandenburger
 Stephen Coate
 Pinelopi K. Goldberg
 Christopher J. Harris
 Kenneth Hendricks
 Philippe Jehiel
 Steven Levitt
 Benny Moldovanu
 Aldo Rustichini
 Neil Shephard
 Hyun-Song Shin
 Jeroen Swinkels

2005

 Daron Acemoğlu
 Andrew G. Atkeson
 Kyle Bagwell
 Herman J. Bierens
 Edward L. Glaeser
 Michael P. Keane
 John Kennan
 Narayana Kocherlakota
 Barton L. Lipman
 W. Bentley MacLeod
 James M. Malcomson
 David Martimort
 Richard D. Rogerson
 Christopher Udry

2006

 Per Krusell
 Andrew McLennan
 Sérgio Rebelo
 Jean-Marc Robin
 Robert Shimer

2007

 Fernando Alvarez
 Lawrence M. Ausubel
 Dirk Bergemann
 Xiaohong Chen
 John C. Heaton
 
 Oliver Linton
 Alessandro Lizzeri
 Pierre Perron
 Michael Peters
 José Víctor Ríos Rull
 Arthur Robson
 Thomas C. Schelling
 Richard J. Smith
 Jonathan P. Thomas

2008

 Torben G. Andersen
 Mark Armstrong
 Martin Cripps
 Ernst Fehr
 Jeremy Greenwood
 Phil Haile
 Ian Jewitt
 Michael Kremer
 Jonathan Levin
 Akihiko Matsui
 Marc Melitz
 Dilip Mookherjee
 Monika Piazzesi
 Robert W. Staiger
 Elie Tamer

2009

 Helmut Bester
 Anne C. Case
 Yeon-Koo Che
 Victor Chernozhukov
 Jeffrey Ely
 Han Hong
 
 
 Robert Duncan Luce
 Thierry Magnac
 Roberto S. Mariano
 Cesar Martinelli
 Paulo Klinger Monteiro
 
 John Nachbar
 Juan Pablo Nicolini
 Manuel Santos
 Lones Smith
 Petra E. Todd
 Mark Walker
 Lin Zhou

2010

 Franklin Allen
 Bruno Biais
 Peter Bossaerts
 Markus K. Brunnermeier
 Parkash Chander
 Esther Duflo
 Jean-Pierre Florens
 Robert G. King
 Felix Kubler
 Ignacio N. Lobato
 George Loewenstein
 Pablo Andrés Neumeyer
 John Quiggin
 Klaus M. Schmidt
 T. Paul Schultz
 Yoon-Jae Whang

2011

 James Andreoni
 Pierpaolo Battigalli
 Nicholas Bloom
 Hongbin Cai
 Soo Hong Chew
 Xavier Gabaix
 Johannes Hörner
 Thomas J. Holmes
 Samuel S. Kortum
 David Laibson
 Albert Marcet
 Joel Mokyr
 Mariano Tommasi
 Edward J. Vytlacil
 Joel Watson
 Fabrizio Zilibotti

2012

 David Austen-Smith
 
 Raj Chetty
 Liran Einav
 Eduardo Engel
 Amy Finkelstein
 
 
 Simon Grant
 
 Rachel Kranton
 Ellen R. McGrattan
 Antonio Merlo
 Marcelo Moreira
 Yingyi Qian
 Suzanne Scotchmer
 Uzi Segal
 
 
 Richard Thaler
 John Van Reenen
 Stanley E. Zin

2013

 Jushan Bai
 Marianne Bertrand
 Judith Chevalier
 Olivier Compte
 Janet Currie
 
 Ali Hortaçsu
 Francis Kramarz
 Massimo Marinacci
 Aviv Nevo
 Thomas Piketty
 Andrea Prat
 Hélène Rey
 Roberto Serrano
 Jeremy Stein
 Kjetil Storesletten
 Gerard van den Berg
 Iván Werning
 Junsen Zhang

2014

 John M. Abowd
 David Autor
 Marco Battaglini
 Matthew Gentzkow
 Mikhail Golosov
 Bruno Jullien
 Pete Klenow
 Sokbae Lee
 Thomas Mariotti
 Ulrich Müller
 Emmanuel Saez
 Susanne Schennach
 Rani Spiegler
 Janet L. Yellen

2015

 George-Marios Angeletos
 Pol Antràs
 Patrick Bajari
 C. Lanier Benkard
 Harold Cole
 Emmanuel Farhi
 Michael Greenstone
 Igal Hendel
 John A. List
 Serena Ng
 Martin Pesendorfer
 Christopher Phelan
 Francis Vella

2016

 Alberto Abadie
 Oriana Bandiera
 Jean-Pierre Benoît
 Raquel Fernández
 Rachel Griffith
 Jonathan Gruber
 John Haltiwanger
 Enrico Moretti
 Parag Pathak
 Luigi Pistaferri
 Lucrezia Reichlin
 Giovanni L. Violante
 Rajiv Vohra
 Annette Vissing-Jørgensen
 John Wooders
 Yves Zenou

2017

 Elchanan Ben-Porath
 Mark Bils
 Stéphane Bonhomme
 Dave Donaldson
 Juan Dubra
 Robert C. Feenstra
 Sergio Firpo
 Richard Holden
 Elyès Jouini
 Eliana La Ferrara
 Robert A. Miller
 Muriel Niederle
 Michele Piccione
 Jack Porter
 Esteban Rossi-Hansberg
 Yuliy Sannikov
 Jesse Shapiro
 Michèle Tertilt
 Leeat Yariv
 Tao Zha

2018

 Mark Aguiar
 Peter Arcidiacono
 Jan De Loecker
 Pascaline Dupas
 Hanming Fang
 Chaim Fershtman
 Roland Fryer
 Masahisa Fujita
 Gita Gopinath
 Sanjeev Goyal
 Yongmiao Hong
 Philipp Kircher
 Nour Meddahi
 Claudio Mezzetti
 Anna Mikusheva
 Fabien Postel-Vinay
 Valerie A. Ramey
 Frank Schorfheide
 Azeem M. Shaikh
 Christopher Taber
 Jaume Ventura
 Leonard Wantchekon

2019

 Alison Booth
 Francesco Caselli
 Sylvain Chassang
 
 Claudio Ferraz
 Kate Ho
 Guido Lorenzoni
 Juan-Pablo Montero
 Yaw Nyarko
 Nicola Persico
 Ricardo Reis
 Barbara Rossi
 Bruno Strulovici
 Tomasz Strzalecki

2020

 Manuel Amador
 Isaiah Andrews
 Raouf Boucekkine
 Moshe Buchinsky
 Aureo de Paula
 Melissa Dell
 Peter DeMarzo
 Habiba Djebbari
 Matthias Doepke
 Federico Echenique
 Chris Edmond
 
 Jesús Fernández-Villaverde
 Christopher J. Flinn
 Nicola Fuchs-Schündeln
 Alfred Galichon
 Pierre-Olivier Gourinchas
 Kaddour Hadri
 Marina Halac
 Charles I. Jones
 Emir Kamenica
 Greg Kaplan
 Maxwell King
 Dirk Krueger
 Gilat Levy
 Francesca Molinari
 Massimo Morelli
 Jessica Pan
 Alessandro Pavan
 Thomas Philippon
 John K.H. Quah
 Imran Rasul
 Stephen J. Redding
 
 Martin Schneider
 Carl Shapiro
 Margaret Slade
 Rodrigo Soares
 Chad Syverson
 Adam Szeidl
 Steve Tadelis
 Satoru Takahashi
 
 Heidi Williams
 Steven R. Williams
 Muhamet Yildiz

2021

Jaap Abbring
Chunrong Ai
Ufuk Akcigit
Simon Board
Antonio Cabrales
Arnaud Costinot
Peter Cramton
Stefano DellaVigna
Prosper Dovonon
Christian Dustmann
Graham Elliot
Marcela Eslava
Armin Falk
Oded Galor
Yuriy Gorodnichenko
Veronica Guerrieri
Luigi Guiso
Bård Harstad
Erik Hurst
Patrick Kline
Fuhito Kojima
Botond Kőszegi
Rim Lahmandi-Ayed
John Leahy
Sydney C. Ludvigson
Ulrike Malmendier
Ramon Marimon
Alexandre Mas
Atif Mian
Magne Mogstad
Benjamin Moll
Sendhil Mullainathan
Victor Murinde
Emi Nakamura
Volker Nocke
Nathan Nunn
Rohini Pande
Bruce Preston
James Robinson
Christina Romer
Antoinette Schoar
Matthew Shum
Rohini Somanathan
Stefanie Stantcheva
Wing Chuen Suen
Balázs Szentes
Silvana Tenreyro
Aleh Tsyvinski
Nicolas Vieille
Ebonya Washington
Ekaterina Zhuravskaya

2022

Mary Amiti
Leah Boustan
Irene Brambilla
Pedro Carneiro
Songnian Chen
Pierre Dubois
Eduardo Faingold
Alessandro Gavazza
Nicola Gennaioli
Raffaella Giacomini
Pauline Grosjean
Fatih Guvenen
Chang-Tai Hsieh
Oleg Itskhoki
Dean Karlan
Navin Kartik
Ilyana Kuziemko
Ricardo Lagos
Thomas Lemieux
Guido Menzio
Giuseppe Moscarini
Rosemarie Nagel
Benjamin Olken
Marco Ottaviani
Giorgio Primiceri
Nancy Qian
Morten Ravn
Marzena Rostek
Andres Santos
Jon Steinsson
Maxwell B. Stinchcombe
Philipp Strack
Amir Sufi
Alemayehu Seyoum Tafesse
Laura Lisl Veldkamp
Alessandra Voena
Hans-Joachim Voth
Alex Wolitzky

Notes

References

External links
 Fellows of the Econometric Society

 
Econometric Society
Econometric Society